The canton of Gray is an administrative division of the Haute-Saône department, northeastern France. Its borders were modified at the French canton reorganisation which came into effect in March 2015. Its seat is in Gray.

It consists of the following communes:
 
Ancier
Angirey
Apremont
Arc-lès-Gray
Battrans
Champtonnay
Champvans
Cresancey
Esmoulins
Essertenne-et-Cecey
Germigney
Gray
Gray-la-Ville
Igny
Mantoche
Nantilly
Noiron
Onay
Saint-Broing
Saint-Loup-Nantouard
Sauvigney-lès-Gray
Le Tremblois
Velesmes-Échevanne
Velet

References

Cantons of Haute-Saône